Devian was a Swedish metal band formed by Legion (former singer for Marduk) and Emil in 2006. Originally called Rebel Angels, then Elizium, and finally went to Devian after they found Elizium had been used too many times, and the new name sounded more mysterious and sinister. They released two albums, Ninewinged Serpent in 2007, and God To The Illfated in 2008. Legion left the band in 2010 due to his job as a tattoo artist. After the other members tried and failed to keep Devian alive, they agreed to disband it.

Discography
 Ninewinged Serpent (2007)
 God to the Illfated (2008)

Line-up
 Joinus - Guitar & Vocals
 Tomas Nilsson - Guitar
 Carl Stjärnlöv - Bass
 Emil Dragutinovic - Drums
 Legion - Vocals (2006–2010)
 Marcus Lundberg - Guitar (2006–2007)
 Roberth Karlsson - Bass (2007–2008)

References

External links
 Official website
 Devian on MySpace
 Interview with Legion @ ME Metalhour

Swedish black metal musical groups
Swedish death metal musical groups
Swedish thrash metal musical groups
Musical groups established in 2006
Musical groups disestablished in 2011
Century Media Records artists